The 2022–23 UNC Asheville Bulldogs men's basketball team represented the University of North Carolina at Asheville in the 2022–23 NCAA Division I men's basketball season. The Bulldogs, who were led by fifth-year head coach Mike Morrell, played their home games at Kimmel Arena in Asheville, North Carolina, as members of the Big South Conference.

Previous season
With the reintroduction of divisions for the first time since the 2013–14 season, the Bulldogs played in the South division. They finished the regular season 16–13, 8–8 in Big South play which resulted in a fourth place in the South division. As the No. 5 seed in the Big South tournament, they lost to Charleston Southern in the first round.

The Bulldogs participated in the College Basketball Invitational as a No. 13 seed, where they defeated No. 4 Stephen F. Austin in the first round before losing to No. 12 Northern Colorado in the quarterfinals.

Roster

Schedule and results

|-
!colspan=12 style=| Exhibition

|-
!colspan=12 style=| Non-conference regular season

|-
!colspan=12 style=| Big South regular season

|-
!colspan=9 style=| Big South tournament

|-
!colspan=9 style=| NCAA Tournament

|-

Source

References

UNC Asheville Bulldogs men's basketball seasons
UNC Asheville Bulldogs
UNC Asheville Bulldogs men's basketball
UNC Asheville Bulldogs men's basketball
UNC Asheville